Ted J. Kroll (August 4, 1919 – April 23, 2002) was an American professional golfer.

Kroll was born in New Hartford, New York.

Kroll served in the United States Army during World War II and earned three Purple Hearts after being wounded four times. Shortly after the war, he took a job as assistant professional at Philmont Country Club in Huntingdon Valley, Pennsylvania. He began a 34-year PGA Tour career in 1949. He won eight times on the tour, including three wins in 1956, when he topped the money list with earnings of $72,836. That same year he lost the final of the PGA Championship to Jack Burke Jr., 3 and 2.

In 1954, Kroll became the third player in PGA Tour history to shoot a 60, joining Al Brosch (1951) and Bill Nary (1952). He had nines of 30-30 at Brackenridge Park Golf Course during the third round of the Texas Open. His 11-under score vaulted him into a tie for sixth going into the final round, where he shot a 2-under 69 over his final 18 holes to tie for ninth.

Kroll played on three Ryder Cup teams: 1953, 1955, and 1957, compiling a 3–1 record.

Kroll was married for over 50 years and had four daughters. In his later years he suffered from Parkinson's disease. He died in Boca Raton, Florida and is buried in Florida National Cemetery in Bushnell, Florida.

Professional wins (11)

PGA Tour wins (8)

PGA Tour playoff record (1–7)

Other wins (3)
this list is probably incomplete
1952 Miami Beach International Four-Ball (with Lew Worsham)
1964 Michigan PGA Championship
1972 Florida Open

Results in major championships

Note: Kroll never played in The Open Championship.

NT = no tournament
CUT = missed the half-way cut
R64, R32, R16, QF, SF = Round in which player lost in PGA Championship match play
"T" indicates a tie for a place

Summary

Most consecutive cuts made – 14 (1957 PGA – 1962 PGA)
Longest streak of top-10s – 4 (1952 U.S. Open – 1953 U.S. Open)

U.S. national team appearances
Ryder Cup: 1953 (winners), 1955 (winners), 1957
Hopkins Trophy: 1952 (winners), 1953 (winners), 1954 (winners), 1956 (winners)

References

External links

American male golfers
PGA Tour golfers
PGA Tour Champions golfers
Ryder Cup competitors for the United States
Golfers from New York (state)
Golfers from Florida
United States Army personnel of World War II
Neurological disease deaths in Florida
Deaths from Parkinson's disease
People from New Hartford, New York
Sportspeople from Boca Raton, Florida
1919 births
2002 deaths